The 1971 ABA Playoffs was the postseason tournament of the American Basketball Association's 1970-1971 season. The tournament concluded with the Western Division champion Utah Stars defeating the Eastern Division champion Kentucky Colonels, four games to three in the ABA finals.

Notable events

There was a one-game playoff for fourth place in the Western Division because the Texas Chaparrals and Denver Rockets had tied with regular season records of 30-54.  The game was played on April 1 and the Chaparrals won 115-109.

This was the first season in ABA history in which the team with the best regular season record did not win the ABA championship.  The Indiana Pacers had the league's best record during this season at 58-26 (.690), putting them one game ahead of the eventual league champion Utah Stars in the Western Division.

This was the first season in ABA history in which neither regular season division champion made it to the ABA finals.  The second place Utah Stars represented the West while the Kentucky Colonels, second place in the East behind the Virginia Squires, met them in the finals.

Game 3 of the Eastern Finals saw 287 total points scored. This was the most points scored in any ABA playoff game, and would be the most points scored in a playoff game in either the NBA or ABA until 1992.

13,260 fans attended Game Seven of the ABA championship series between the Utah Stars and Kentucky Colonels at the Salt Palace in Salt Lake City, Utah on May 18, 1971.  After the Stars won 131-121 the fans stormed the floor and mobbed the court for twenty minutes.  Willie Wise and Zelmo Beaty rode off the floor carried upon the shoulders of Utah fans.

Zelmo Beaty was named Most Valuable Player of the ABA playoffs.

Western Division

Champion:  Utah Stars

Division Semifinals

(1) Indiana Pacers vs. (3) Memphis Pros:
Pacers win series 4-0
Game 1 @ Indiana:  Indiana 114, Memphis 98
Game 2 @ Indiana:  Indiana 106, Memphis 104
Game 3 @ Memphis:  Indiana 91, Memphis 90
Game 4 @ Memphis:  Indiana 102, Memphis 101

(2) Utah Stars vs. (4) Texas Chaparrals:
Stars win series 4-0
Game 1 @ Utah:  Utah 125, Texas 115
Game 2 @ Utah:  Utah 137, Texas 107
Game 3 @ Texas:  Utah 113, Texas 101
Game 4 @ Texas:  Utah 128, Texas 107

Division Finals

(1) Indiana Pacers vs. (2) Utah Stars:
Stars win series 4-3
Game 1 @ Indiana:  Utah 120, Indiana 118
Game 2 @ Indiana:  Indiana 120, Utah 107
Game 3 @ Utah:  Utah 121, Indiana 108
Game 4 @ Utah:  Utah 126, Indiana 99
Game 5 @ Indiana:  Indiana 127, Utah 109
Game 6 @ Utah:  Indiana 105, Utah 102
Game 7 @ Indiana:  Utah 108, Indiana 101

Eastern Division

Champion:  Kentucky Colonels

Division Semifinals

(1) Virginia Squires vs. (3) New York Nets:
Squires win series 4-2
Game 1 @ Virginia:  Virginia 113, New York 105
Game 2 @ Virginia:  Virginia 114, New York 108
Game 3 @ New York:  New York 135, Virginia 131
Game 4 @ New York:  New York 130, Virginia 127
Game 5 @ Virginia:  Virginia 127, New York 124
Game 6 @ New York:  Virginia 118, New York 114

(2) Kentucky Colonels vs. (4) The Floridians:
Colonels win series 4-2
Game 1 @ Kentucky:  Kentucky 116, Florida 112
Game 2 @ Kentucky:  Kentucky 120, Florida 110
Game 3 @ Florida:  Florida 120, Kentucky 102
Game 4 @ Florida:  Florida 129, Kentucky 117
Game 5 @ Kentucky:  Kentucky 118, Florida 101
Game 6 @ Florida:  Kentucky 112, Florida 103

Division Finals

(1) Virginia Squires vs. (2) Kentucky Colonels:
Colonels win series 4-2
Game 1 @ Virginia:  Kentucky 136, Virginia 132
Game 2 @ Virginia:  Virginia 142, Kentucky 122
Game 3 @ Kentucky:  Virginia 150, Kentucky 137
Game 4 @ Kentucky:  Kentucky 128, Virginia 110
Game 5 @ Virginia:  Kentucky 117, Virginia 105
Game 6 @ Kentucky:  Kentucky 129, Virginia 117

ABA Finals

(2) Utah Stars VS. (2) Kentucky Colonels:
Stars win series 4-3
Game 1 (May  3) @ Utah:  Utah 136, Kentucky 117
Game 2 (May  5) @ Utah:  Utah 138, Kentucky 125
Game 3 (May  7) @ Kentucky:  Kentucky 116, Utah 110
Game 4 (May  8) @ Kentucky:  Kentucky 129, Utah 125
Game 5 (May 12) @ Utah:  Utah 137, Kentucky  127
Game 6 (May 15) @ Kentucky:  Kentucky 105, Utah 102
Game 7 (May 18) @ Utah:  Utah 131, Kentucky 121

References

External links
RememberTheABA.com page on 1971 ABA playoffs
Basketball-Reference.com's 1971 ABA Playoffs page

Playoffs
American Basketball Association playoffs